Super Challenge is an Indian Tamil-language television game show that aired on Sun TV from February 8, 2015 to April 16, 2017. The show's hosts were Rishi, Kavitha and Nisha. The show presented celebrities from Sun TV's serials and other Tamil celebrities. They divided into two teams challenging one another in various tasks.

Super Challenge was designed to be a family show and aimed to bring together the entire family audience during Sunday lunchtime.

The show consisted of 5 rounds.

Rounds
The show was organized into multiple rounds:

Round 1: Twinkle Twinkle Little Star (Match the Picture)
Identify celebrities in photographs.

Round 2: Konjam Yosi Konjam Vaasi (Pass the Melody)
Chinese whisper game played with music and instruments.

Round 3: Pesum Padam (Pictionary)
Charades played with the help of the celebrities drawing skills.

Round 4: Weight Party (Weigh the Star)
Guess the weight of a chosen participant team using a large scale. The team members had to guess the equivalent number of fruits and vegetables it would take to match the celebrities weight.

Round 5: Beem Boy Beem Boy (Super Sumo)
The participants overcome their weight and perform challenging tasks wearing sumo suits.

Episodes

(*) = Have Storyline

 Eve absent one episode. (7)
 Redwan absent one episode. (9)
 Ameer absent one episode. (11)
 Alia absent two episodes. (3, 7)
 Elisya absent three episodes. (10-12)

Others

References

External links
 Official Website 
 Sun TV on YouTube
 Sun TV Network 
 Sun Group 

Sun TV original programming
2015 Tamil-language television series debuts
Tamil-language reality television series
Tamil-language comedy television series
Tamil-language game shows
Tamil-language talk shows
Tamil-language television shows
2017 Tamil-language television series endings